The 1955 All-Pacific Coast football team consists of American football players chosen by the Associated Press (AP) and the United Press (UP) as the best college football players by position in the Pacific Coast region during the 1955 college football season. The AP team was limited to players form the Pacific Coast Conference (PCC) and was based on votes of football writers of more than 20 AP member newspapers on the west coast. The UP team included players from non-PCC schools.

The 1955 UCLA Bruins football team won the PCC championship and was ranked No. 4 in the final AP Poll. Six UCLA players were selected by either the AP or UP on the first team: backs Sam Brown and Bob Davenport; end Rommie Loudd; guards Hardiman Cureton and Jim Brown; and center Steve Palmer. Cureton was the only PCC player to be selected as a consensus first-team player on the 1955 All-America college football team.

Selections

Backs
 Jon Arnett, USC (AP-1; UP-1)
 Sam Brown, UCLA (AP-1; UP-1)
 Bob Davenport, UCLA (AP-1; UP-1)
 John Brodie, Stanford (AP-1; UP-2)
 Bill Tarr, Stanford (AP-2; UP-1)
 Dick James, Oregon (AP-2; UP-2)
 Ronnie Knox, UCLA (AP-2)
 Joe Francis, Oregon State (AP-2; UP-3)
 Art Luppino, Arizona (UP-2)
 Green, Washington (UP-2)
 Ken Swearingen, Pacific (UP-3)
 Teresa, San Jose State (UP-3)
 Jim Shanley, Oregon (UP-3)

Ends
 Rommie Loudd, UCLA (AP-1; UP-1)
 John Stewart, Stanford (AP-1; UP-2)
 A. D. Williams, Pacific (UP-1)
 Jim Carmichael, California (AP-2; UP-3)
 Jim Houston, Washington (AP-2; UP-2)
 Powell, San Jose State (UP-3)

Tackles
 John Witte, Oregon State (AP-1; UP-1)
 Paul Wiggin, Stanford (AP-1; UP-2)
 Fred Robinson, Washington (AP-2; UP-1)
 Gil Moreno, UCLA (AP-2; UP-3)
 John Nisby, Pacific (UP-2)
 John Jankins, Arizona State (UP-3)

Guards
 Jim Brown, UCLA (AP-1; UP-2)
 Orlando Ferrante, USC (AP-1; UP-1)
 Hardiman Cureton, UCLA (AP-2; UP-1)
 Earl Monlux, Washington (AP-2; UP-3)
 Tony Mosich, Stanford (UP-2)
 Vaughan Hitchcock, Washington State (UP-3)

Centers
 Steve Palmer, UCLA (AP-1; UP-1)
 Joe Long, Stanford (AP-2; UP-2)
 Bert Watson, Washington (UP-3)

Key
AP = Associated Press, "selected by a vote of more than a score of football writers from AP member newspapers up and down the West Coast"

UP = United Press

See also
1955 College Football All-America Team

References

All-Pacific Coast Football Team
All-Pacific Coast football teams
All-Pac-12 Conference football teams